The Bosporan–Sindian War was a war between the Sindike Kingdom and its allied tribes against the Bosporan Kingdom in the 4th century BC. The war took place amidst the wars of expansion and took the life of the brother of Leukon and Gorgippos, Metrodoros.

Prelude
The Spartocids had been expanding their dominion into the nearby cities of Nymphaeum and Kimmerikon and had set their sights on the Sindike Kingdom. Satyros, in an attempt to gain influence, told the Sindike king, Hekataios, to marry his daughter after he had recently been restored by Satyros. Satyros also demanded that he kill his current wife, Tirgatao, to further assert his control over Hekataios. Not being able to kill his beloved wife, Hekataios sent her to be imprisoned in a tower. However, she was able to escape and evade the capture of Satyros, and returned to her home tribe.

Conflict
After evading capture, she returned to her land and roused the Ixomatae to war and gained many allies that she used to strike at both Satyros and Hekataios.

After seeing himself in a double-front war, he sued for peace and used his son Metrodoros as a hostage. Meanwhile they were at peace, Satyros plotted against her, sending his friends to her court as refugees. His friends then failed in assassinating her, leading to the death of Metrodoros and war once again. Satyros died in a siege and the war was passed unto his sons Leukon and Gorgippos, who sued for peace shortly after their ascension.

As the war came to a peace, Tirgatao induced her son by Hekataios, Oktamasades to usurp his father and to make war on the Bosporans. In the following days, Oktamasades took the city of Labrytai, provoking Leukon into declaring war in the name of Hekataios. Leukon, angered at the attack of one of his cities, attacked Oktamasades in the ensuing battle of Labrytai and routed his army completely, forcing Oktamasades to flee into Scythia.

Aftermath
To honor his victory over the Sindoi, Leukon erected a monument to Apollo. Shortly after his victory, Hekataios may have renounced his power, or died due to age, but as one of his last acts, he may have bequeathed his kingdom to Leukon and Gorgippos, successfully completing their father's original vision and expanding their realm.

References

Wars of the Bosporan Kingdom
380 Conflicts